The following is a list of the Dead Sea Scrolls from the cave 6 near  Qumran.

Description
Wadi Qumran Cave 6 was discovered alongside Cave 5 in 1952, shortly after the discovery of Cave 4. Cave 6 contained fragments of about 31 manuscripts.

List of manuscripts
Some resources for more complete information on the Dead Sea Scrolls are the book by Emanuel Tov, "Revised Lists of the Texts from the Judaean Desert" for a complete list of all of the Dead Sea Scroll texts, as well as the online webpages for the Shrine of the Book and the Leon Levy Collection, both of which present photographs and images of the scrolls and fragments themselves for closer study.  Information is not always comprehensive, as content for many scrolls has not yet been fully published.

{|class="wikitable"
|-
! Fragment or Scroll Identifier
! Fragment or Scroll Name
! Alternative Identifier
! English Bible Association
! Language
! Date/Script
! Description
! Reference
|-
! colspan="8" style="background:#b8c7d6;"|
Qumran Cave 6
|-
| 6QpaleoGen
||Genesis
|6Q1|| Genesis 6:13–21 ||Hebrew
|Early Hellenistic; Palaeo-Hebrew script|| ||
|-
| 6QpaleoLev
|| Leviticus
|6Q2||  Leviticus 8:12–13
||Hebrew
|Early Hellenistic; Palaeo-Hebrew script|| ||
|-
| pap6QDeut or 6QpapDeut(?)
||Deuteronomy
|6Q3||  Deuteronomy 26:19
||Hebrew
|Hellenistic-Roman|| A few letters of Deuteronomy 26:19 on papyrus||6Q3 at the Leon Levy Dead Sea Scrolls Digital Library
|-
| 6QpapKgs 
|| Kings
|6Q4||  1 Kings 3:12–14; 12:28–31; 22:28–31; 2 Kings 5:26; 6:32; 7:8–10,20; 8:1–5; 9:1–2; 10:19–21
||Hebrew
|Hasmonean||Made up of 94 Fragments. ||
|-
| pap6QPs or 6QpapPs(?)
||Psalms
|6Q5||  Psalm 78:36–37
||Hebrew
|Herodian|| ||
|-
| 6QCant
||Song of Songs
|6Q6||  Song of Songs 1:1–7
||Hebrew
|Herodian|| ||
|-
| 6QpapDan 
|| Daniel
|6Q7||  Daniel 8:20–21; 10:8–16; 11:33–36,38; 8:16–17
|Hebrew
|Herodian||13 papyrus fragments. ||
|-
| 6QpapGiants or pap6QEnGiants 
|| Book of Giants from Enoch
|6Q8||
|Aramaic|| Herodian || Part of the "Book of Giants"
|| 
|-
| 6Qpap apocrSam-Kgs or pap6QapocrSam/Kgs
||Apocryphon on Samuel–Kings
|6Q9|| 
|Hebrew|| Hasmonean || Samuel–Kings apocryphon. Written on papyrus.
|
|-
| 6QpapaProph or pap6QProph
|| Unidentified prophetic fragment
|6Q10||  || Hebrew
|Hasmonean|| Prophetic text. Written in papyrus
|
|-
| 6QAllegory 
|| Allegory of the Vine
|6Q11|| 
|rowspan=3| Hebrew
|Herodian|| Fragment containing an Allegory mentioning a vine
|
|-
| 6QapProph
|| An apocryphal prophecy
|6Q12||
|Herodian||
|
|-
| 6QPriestProph
||Priestly Prophecy
|6Q13||
|Herodian||A priestly prophecy
|
|-
|6Q Apocalypse
|Apocalyptic text
|6Q14
|
|Aramaic
|Herodian
|Two fragments with apocalyptic text
|
|-
|6QD
|Damascus Document
|6Q15
|
|rowspan=4|Hebrew
|Herodian
|Damascus Document 4:19–21; 5:13–14,18–21; 6:1–2,20–21; 7:1
|
|-
|6QpapBened or pap6QBen
|papBenediction
|6Q16
|
|Herodian
|Blessings related 1QSb. On papyrus
|
|-
|6QCalDoc
|Calendrical Document
|6Q17
|
|Herodian
|Calendric fragment
|
|-
|pap6QHymn
| Hymn
|6Q18
|
|Herodian
|Fragment of a hymn, related to 1QM
|
|-
|6Q Text Related to Genesis
|Genesis
|6Q19
|Possibly from Genesis
|Aramaic
|Herodian
|Related to Genesis 10:6,20
|
|-
|6QDeut(?)
|Deuteronomy
|6Q20
|Possibly from Deuteronomy
|Hebrew
|Hellenistic-Roman
|Related to Deuteronomy 11:10
|
|-
|6QfrgProph or 6Q Prophetic Text
| Possibly prophetic text
|6Q21
|
|Hebrew
|Herodian
|Prophetic fragment containing 5 words.
|
|-
|pap6QUnidA
|Unclassified fragments
|6Q22
|
|Hebrew
|Herodian
|
|
|-
|pap6QUnidA ar
|Unclassified fragments
|6Q23
|
|Aramaic
|Herodian
|Related to "Words of the Book of Michael"
|
|-
|6QUnidB
|Unclassified fragments
|6Q24
|
|Hebrew
|Hellenistic-Roman
|
|
|-
|6QUnidB
|Unclassified fragments
|6Q25
|
|Aramaic
|Herodian
|
|
|-
|6QUnidB or 6QpapAccount or Contract
|Accounts or contracts
|6Q26
|
|Aramaic
|Hellenistic-Roman
|
|
|-
|6QUnidB
| Unclassified fragments
|6Q27–6Q28
|
|Hebrew
|Hellenistic-Roman
|
|
|-
|6QpapProv
| Proverbs
|6Q30
|Proverbs 11:4b–7a,10b
|Hebrew
|Roman
|Single six-line fragment
|
|-
|6QUnidB
|Unclassified fragments
|6Q31
|
|Aramaic
|Herodian
|
|
|}

See also 
 Biblical manuscripts
 Septuagint manuscripts
 List of Hebrew Bible manuscripts

References

Bibliography

External links
 A Catalog of Biblical Passages in the Dead Sea Scrolls by David Washburn, 2002
 Textual Criticism: Recovering the Text of the Hebrew Bible by Peter Kyle McCarter, 1986

Dead Sea Scrolls